The 2018 WCBA Playoffs was the postseason tournament of the 2017–18 season. It began on January 24, 2018.

First round
All times are in China standard time (UTC+8)

(1) Beijing Great Wall vs. (8) Zhejiang Chouzhou Bank Golden Bulls

(2) Xinjiang Magic Deer vs. (7) Guangdong Dolphins

(3) Shanxi Flame vs. (6) Heilongjiang Dragons

(4) Shanghai Swordfish vs. (5) Jiangsu Phoenix

Semifinals

(1) Beijing Great Wall vs. (4) Shanghai Swordfish

(3) Shanxi Flame vs. (7) Guangdong Dolphins

Final

(1) Beijing Great Wall vs. (3) Shanxi Flame

References

League